Granville County Courthouse is a historic courthouse building located at Oxford, Granville County, North Carolina.  It was built in 1838, and is a two-story, "H"-shaped, Greek Revival style brick building.  It has a three bay central pavilion and a polygonal cupola with a domed room.

It was listed on the National Register of Historic Places in 1979. It is located in the Oxford Historic District.

References

County courthouses in North Carolina
Courthouses on the National Register of Historic Places in North Carolina
Greek Revival architecture in North Carolina
Government buildings completed in 1838
Buildings and structures in Granville County, North Carolina
National Register of Historic Places in Granville County, North Carolina
Historic district contributing properties in North Carolina
1838 establishments in North Carolina